Yann Candele (born March 11, 1971) is a Canadian equestrian who competes in the sport of show jumping.

He won the 2009 and 2010 Nations' Cups in Wellington, Florida. He competed at 2010 and 2014 World Equestrian Games.

In July 2016, he was named to Canada's Olympic team.
His previous international experience include competing as a junior for France in the European championships, and winning the Asian World Cup League 1991–1992. He has also represented France in 2004 at the World Cup Final in Milan, Italy. 
He moved to Canada in 1999, coaching, riding and training at several top stables in Canada. He opened his own training business, Normandy Hills, in 2007. He became a Canadian citizen in 2009, and is currently living in Caledon, Ontario, Canada.

References

External links 
 Official website 

1971 births
Living people
Canadian show jumping riders
Sportspeople from Ontario
Equestrians at the 2015 Pan American Games
Equestrians at the 2016 Summer Olympics
Olympic equestrians of Canada
Canadian male equestrians
Pan American Games gold medalists for Canada
Pan American Games medalists in equestrian
Medalists at the 2015 Pan American Games
21st-century Canadian people
20th-century Canadian people